The CVR College of Engineering was established in 2000. It is approved by the All India Council for Technical Education and accredited by the National Board of Accreditation, India.

CVR College of Engineering was affiliated with Jawaharlal Nehru Technological University, Hyderabad. The college is located in Mangalpally(V), Ibrahimpatnam(M), Ranga Reddy,  from the center of Hyderabad, India. The college is supported by the Cherabuddi Educational Society.

Academics
The college offers the following courses:

Bachelor of Technology
Departments:
ECE
EEE
EIE
CSE
IT
CSIT
Mechanical
H&S
Civil
ED Cell

M.Tech
 VLSI Design
 Embedded Systems
 Computer Science
 Computer Science and Engineering
 Electrical Power Engineering
 Wireless Mobile and Communication
 Artificial Intelligence
 Data Sciences

Postgraduate

Rankings

The National Institutional Ranking Framework (NIRF) ranked it 141 among engineering colleges in 2020.

Gallery

Infrastructure
 Spread over a built-up area of over 36000 square metres on a  campus, the college has 71 classrooms, 23 professors' rooms, 60 teachers' rooms, six air-conditioned conference rooms, 40 labs, and about 1280 computer systems, supported by UPS and continuous power back-up from generators.
 There are 1186 computers in the departments.
 The college has an ELCS (English Learning and Communication Skills) lab.
 There is a three-story building for the exclusive use of library and postgraduate research facilities. The CVR library has 35,000 books and 280+ journals (including IEEE Journals).
 The auditorium, seating 1500 people, is used for workshops, conferences and seminars organized by the college and is fully air-conditioned.
 A fleet of around 57 buses serve the college from all parts of the city.
 The canteen provides food to students and staff.

Activities
CVR College of Engineering organizes an annual technical festival, Ciencia.

CVR College of Engineering organizes state level inter college annual sports meet, ENGINEERING PREMIER LEAGUE -EPL(started in 2017).

Notable alumni

 Sankalp Reddy, Director of The Ghazi Attack, Antariksham 9000 KMPH
 Raghuram, Telugu Film singer and Music Composer
 Roll Rida, Rapper, contestant of Bigg Boss Telugu 2
 Prasanth Varma, Director of Awe, Kalki

See also 
Education in India
Literacy in India
List of institutions of higher education in Telangana

References

External links

 

Engineering colleges in Hyderabad, India
All India Council for Technical Education
2000 establishments in Andhra Pradesh